The following is a list of films produced in the Kannada film industry in India in 1985, presented in alphabetical order.

See also
Kannada films of 1984
Kannada films of 1986

References

1985
Kannada
Films, Kannada